Clinopegma decora is a species of Buccinidae. The species is distributed in the Sea of Japan, off of south-western Sakhalin Island. The species is distributed in mud and muddy sand between a depth of 20 to 64 meters.

References

External links

Buccinidae
Gastropods described in 1925